Govind Ballabh Pant Institute of Engineering and Technology (GBPIET) (known as Govind Ballabh Pant Engineering College before August 2017) is an autonomous institution for higher technical education located in Ghurdauri of Pauri Garhwal district, in the north Indian state of Uttarakhand. College run by the government of Uttarakhand, India. It was created in 1989 and named after the memory of the first Chief Minister of Uttar Pradesh, statesman and Bharat Ratna recipient Pandit Govind Ballabh Pant.

History
Gobind Ballabh  Pant  Institute of Engineering and Technology   was established by the Government of Uttar Pradesh in 1989. It started its first academic session in 1991. The institute is affiliated with Uttarakhand Technical University, Dehradun. since 2006.

It is located about 11 km from Pauri, the District headquarters, and is about 33 km from Dev Prayag, a historical and pilgrimage place. When the weather is clear a panoramic view of Himalayas as well as a short view of Srinagar can be seen from GBPIET. The college is financed by the Government of Uttarakhand and managed by the Board of Governors with the Minister of Technical Education, Government of Uttarakhand, as the Chairman.

Courses
The institute offers courses in MCA, M. Tech, and B. Tech. The college provides seven undergraduate, five postgraduate, and six doctoral courses.

Departments

 Applied Sciences and Humanities
 Biotechnology
 Civil Engineering
 Computer Science and Applications
 Computer Science and Engineering

 Electrical Engineering 
 Electronics and Communication Engineering
 Mechanical Engineering
	  
The College offers undergraduate B. Tech. degrees in:
	 
  Biotechnology Engineering (60 seats)
  Civil Engineering (60 seats)
  Computer Science and Engineering (60 seats)
  Electrical Engineering (60 seats)
  Artificial Intelligence& Machine Learning(60 seats)
  Electronics and Communication Engineering (60 seats)
  Mechanical Engineering (60 seats)
  Production Engineering (15 seats)
	 
The College offers postgraduate programmes M.C.A. (Master of Computer Applications), M.Tech programmes in  biotechnology, digital signal processing, computer science and engineering, and production engineering.
	 
The Institute offers doctorate degrees Ph.D. in Biotechnology, Electronics and Communication Engineering, Computer Science and Applications, Computer Science and Engineering, and Electrical Engineering and Production Engineering

References

External links
GBPEC Alumni website
GBPEC Official Website

Engineering colleges in Uttarakhand
Pauri Garhwal district
1989 establishments in Uttar Pradesh
Educational institutions established in 1989